Ali Owsat Mahalleh (also Romanized as ‘Alī Owsaţ Maḩalleh) is a village in Machian Rural District, Kelachay District, Rudsar County, Gilan Province, Iran. At the 2006 census, its population was 120, in 32 families.

References 

Populated places in Rudsar County